Gieboldehausen is a Samtgemeinde ("collective municipality") in the district of Göttingen, in Lower Saxony, Germany. Its seat is in the municipality Gieboldehausen.

The Samtgemeinde Gieboldehausen consists of the following municipalities:

 Bilshausen
 Bodensee
 Gieboldehausen
 Krebeck
 Obernfeld
 Rhumspringe
 Rollshausen
 Rüdershausen
 Wollbrandshausen
 Wollershausen

Samtgemeinden in Lower Saxony